Hiroshi Kojima (born 27 January 1938) is a Japanese field hockey player. He competed in the men's tournament at the 1960 Summer Olympics.

References

External links
 

1938 births
Living people
Japanese male field hockey players
Olympic field hockey players of Japan
Field hockey players at the 1960 Summer Olympics
Sportspeople from Hiroshima